James Ray Fitterling is an American business executive. He is the Chairman and CEO of Dow Inc., Fitterling serves as vice chair of the National Association of Manufacturers, and on the boards of the American Chemistry Council and the U.S.-China Business Council. The first board-appointed out CEO of a Fortune 100 company; he was ranked the world's top LGBT executive by the Financial Times in 2018.

Early life and education
Jim Fitterling was born in 1962  in Missouri, where he spent his youth in a small farm town. He attended the University of Missouri, graduating from the school's College of Engineering in 1983 with a BS in mechanical engineering.

Career

1984-2004: Early roles with Dow

In 1984, Fitterling was hired by The Dow Chemical Company. In 1998, he became CEO of Filmtec Corporation, a subsidiary of Dow. Also in 1998, he became global business director of Dow's liquid separations unit. He was named both general manager of Dow Thailand and managing director of the SCC - Dow Group of joint venture companies in 2000. In 2002, Fitterling became CEO of The OPTIMAL Group, an affiliate company of both Dow and Petroliam Nasional Berhad. He began overseeing OPTIMAL's regions in Southeast Asia and Australia in 2004.

2005-2015: Dow executive roles
He left OPTIMAL Group in 2005 to become business vice president of polyethylene at Dow Chemical Corporation. He then served as Dow's president of basic plastics from 2007 until 2009. Soon, Fitterling was also a member of several committees at Dow, including the Executive Leadership Committee, the Management Committee and the Strategy Board.

In 2012, Fitterling was given "executive oversight of feedstocks, performance plastics in Asia and Latin America." While still an executive vice president, in November 2012, Fitterling was appointed a member of Dow's newly formed executive committee. In 2014, Fitterling became vice chairman of business operations for Dow. In October 2015, he was named chief operating officer of Dow, which announced its merger with DuPont in December 2015. Fitterling then worked with Dow's CEO on reforming the new company into three separate entities, and to later be COO of the new Dow company.

2016-2019: Dow president and CEO
On February 2, 2016, Dow Chemical announced that Fitterling would be replacing Andrew Liveris as Dow president upon Liveris' retirement in 2017. In 2016, he was named Dow's president and chief operating officer, positions he still held into 2017. From September 2017 to March 2019, Fitterling also served as COO of the materials science division of DowDuPont. 

On March 12, 2018, he was named the CEO of the new Dow Inc., which was split, on April 1, 2019, from DowDuPont, as the new parent company of The Dow Chemical Company. In 2019, he became the first openly gay CEO of a large industrial company and the first board-appointed out CEO of a Fortune 100 company.

Appearances and awards 

Fitterling has appeared in the media as a Dow representative. He was the keynote speaker at the 2015 Manufacturing Leadership Summit, and has spoken at the IHS World Petrochemical Conference in Houston, Texas. In 2017, the American Institute of Chemical Engineers (AIChE) awarded him the “Doing a World of Good” Medal. In 2018, he was given the College of Engineering Alumni Award from the Mizzou Alumni Association.

Following a bout with cancer in celebration of National Coming Out Day, in 2014 Fitterling came out to Dow's employees. He is an advocate for diversity in corporate and educational settings and, in 2016, was quoted by The Wall Street Journal on Dow's public campaign against anti-gay rights legislation in states such as North Carolina, Tennessee, Mississippi, and Georgia. Fitterling was ranked #73 on the Top 100 LGBT Leaders list published by The Financial Times in 2015, ranking #28 the following year, #1 in 2018, and #3 in 2019. In March 2019, he was featured in the Bloomberg Businessweek article "How Dow Chemical Got Woke".

Boards 
Fitterling is vice chair of the National Association of Manufacturers' board, as well as on the boards of the American Chemistry Council and the U.S.-China Business Council. He is a trustee at the Herbert H. and Grace A. Dow Foundation. He is also on the CEO Roundtable of the American Heart Association, and on the Dean's Engineering Advisory Council at the University of Missouri. Fitterling was previously chairman at Univation Technologies LLC and on the boards of TCF Financial Corporation and Sadara Chemical Company. He was also president of the board of the Midland Country Club in Michigan.

Personal life 

Fitterling is a resident of Midland, Michigan.

References

External links
Fitterling at Dow.com

Living people
University of Missouri alumni
People from Midland, Michigan
1962 births
American chief executives of materials companies
Directors of Dow Inc.
Gay businessmen
American LGBT businesspeople
LGBT people from Michigan